Ornette at 12 is an album by the American jazz saxophonist and composer Ornette Coleman released on the Impulse! label in 1969.

In 2017, Real Gone Music reissued Ornette at 12 on CD as part of a compilation that also included Crisis.

Reception
The AllMusic review by Brian Olewnick awarded the album 3 stars and stated "Don't be put off by the critics; Ornette at 12 is a fine, enjoyable album".

Track listing
All compositions by Ornette Coleman
 "C.O.D." – 7:25 
 "Rainbows" – 8:56 
 "New York" – 8:13 
 "Bells and Chimes" – 7:15 
Recorded at the Hearst Greek Amphitheatre, University of California, Berkeley, Berkeley, CA, August 11, 1968

Personnel
Ornette Coleman – alto saxophone, trumpet, violin
Dewey Redman – tenor saxophone 
Charlie Haden – bass
Denardo Coleman – drums

References

1968 live albums
Ornette Coleman albums
Impulse! Records albums